Fillip is a Vancouver-based contemporary art publishing organization formed in 2004. It publishes a magazine as well as books of critical writing. The magazine with the same name was started in 2005. The publisher of the magazine is the Projectile Publishing Society, a Canadian non-profit.

In 2008 it opened an office on the border between Gastown and the Downtown Eastside from which it hosts month events including artist talks, publication launches, and screenings.

Fillip builds on Vancouver's tradition of critical art publishing such as the pre-magazine era Vanguard (1972–78), Boo (1994–98), and Last Call (2001–02) by stimulating conversations about contemporary art through critical writing, projects, and events.

Books
Beginning in 2009, Fillip began publishing artist books and books of critical writing under the Fillip Editions imprint.

Supplement series 

 Supplement 2: Susanne Kriemann and Eva Wilson, 2017 
 Supplement 1: John C. Welchman, 2015

Folio series 

 Folio D: Sohrab Mohebbi and Ruth Estévez, eds., Hotel Theory Reader, 2017 (co-published with REDCAT, Los Angeles)
 Folio C: Jeff Khonsary and Kristina Lee Podesva, eds., Institutions by Artists Vol. 1, 2012
 Folio B: Antonia Hirsch, ed., Intangible Economies, 2012
 Folio A: Jeff Khonsary and Melanie O'Brian, eds., Judgment and Contemporary Art Criticism, 2010 (co-published with Artspeak, Vancouver)

Artist's books 

 Antonia Hirsch, Komma (After Dalton Trumbo' Johnny Got His Gun), 2011
 Silvia Kolbowski, Dear Silvia...July 2009, 2010
 Mark Manders, Traducing Ruddle, 2010 (co-published with Roma Publications, Antwerp)
 Sabine Bitter and Helmut Weber, Autogestion, or Henri Lefebvre in New Belgrade, 2009 (co-published with Sternberg Press, Berlin)

Notable contributors 
 Luis Camnitzer
 Paul Chan
 Diedrich Diederichsen
 James Elkins
 Maria Fusco
 Dan Graham
 Boris Groys
 Antonia Hirsch
 Candice Hopkins
 Miwon Kwon
 Sven Lütticken
 Metahaven
 Lawrence Rinder
 Slavs and Tatars
 Monika Szewczyk
 Jan Verwoert

References

External links
 

Visual arts magazines published in Canada
Contemporary art magazines
Magazines established in 2005
Magazines published in Vancouver
2005 establishments in British Columbia